Kargatsky District is an administrative and municipal district (raion), one of the thirty in Novosibirsk Oblast, Russia. It is located in the center of the oblast. Its administrative center is the town of Kargat. Population: 18,207 (2010 Census);  The population of Kargat accounts for 55.2% of the district's total population. Lake Ubinskoye extends into the district's northwest corner.

References

Notes

Sources

Districts of Novosibirsk Oblast